Cellcard, a trademark of CamGSM Co. Ltd, is a Cambodian-owned and -operated telecommunications company, offering mobile communications and entertainment services for both consumer and corporate markets. It was launched in 1998.

History
CamGSM Co. Ltd, a corporation duly established in 1996, and the mother brand of Cellcard (launched in 1998), was originally a joint venture between Luxembourg-based Millicom International Cellular S.A. (61.5%) and The Royal Group of Companies (38.5%). In 2009, RG acquired Millicom's share for US$346 million, making it the only telecommunications company in the country, 100% Cambodian owned and operated.

References

Telecommunications companies of Cambodia
Privately held companies of Cambodia
Cambodian brands
Internet service providers
Companies based in Phnom Penh
Telecommunications companies established in 1998
Cambodian companies established in 1998